SJIS may refer to:

 Shift JIS, a character encoding for the Japanese language
 St. John's International School (Belgium)
 Saint John's International School (Thailand)
 Saint John's International School (Malaysia)
 Sydney Japanese International School